Barbie Wilde is a Canadian-born British actress and writer, perhaps best known for appearing as the Female Cenobite in Hellbound: Hellraiser II (1988) – the second of ten Hellraiser films based on Clive Barker's novella, The Hellbound Heart.

Early life and career
Wilde was born on 21 January 1960 in Canada and raised in the United States, she studied classical mime with Desmond Jones in London and in 1978 joined his company, SILENTS, at that time the largest mime company in Britain. In 1979, along with Robert Pereno, LA Richards, Carole Caplin, Tim Dry and Sean Crawford (Tik and Tok), Miss Wilde formed SHOCK: a rock/mime/burlesque/music troupe.  SHOCK toured with Depeche Mode and Classix Nouveaux in the early 1980s and supported Adam and the Ants at The Venue (London), Ultravox at The Rainbow Theatre (London) and Gary Numan at Wembley Arena (April 1981). SHOCK released two singles with RCA Records: 'Angel Face' and 'Dynamo Beat' produced by Richard James Burgess of Landscape.

In 1986 she robotically mimed with British TV legends Morecambe and Wise in their Christmas TV Special of 1983 and appeared as a robotic mime as part of the duo Technical Glamour on The Sooty Show, the longest running children's TV program in the UK. As well as Hellbound: Hellraiser II, her other film appearances include Death Wish 3 (1985) starring Charles Bronson and Grizzly II: The Predator (1987) starring Charlie Sheen, George Clooney and Laura Dern.

In the 1980s, Miss Wilde wrote and hosted 'The American Hot 100' (Skytrax TV) as well as 'The Morning Show' & 'Supersonic' for Music Box, where she interviewed Jimmy Somerville from Bronski Beat, Roger Taylor of Queen and The Sisters of Mercy. In 1987, Miss Wilde presented a long-running music show for Granada Television called 'Hold Tight', where she interviewed such pop personalities as Cliff Richard, John Lydon (AKA Johnny Rotten of the Sex Pistols), Iggy Pop, The B-52's, Black, Pepsi & Shirlie and Lisa Stansfield. In 1988, she wrote and presented 'The Small Screen', a film review program for the Night Network on London Weekend Television, where she interviewed actor Hugh Grant. In the 1990s, Miss Wilde hosted a live music program, 'The Gig', for London Weekend Television and the movie history program, 'Sprockets' for Sky Digital Television.

Barbie Wilde has also worked as an assistant casting director for the BBC production of The Buddha of Suburbia (1993) and as a casting director for MTV's London production of The Real World (1995).

Writing
Short horror stories by Barbie Wilde include 'Sister Cilice' for the anthology 'Hellbound Hearts' (Pocket Books September 2009), edited by Paul Kane and Marie O'Regan and inspired by Clive Barker's Hellraiser universe; 'U for Uranophobia' for the anthology 'Phobophobia'  (Dark Continents 2011), 'American Mutant: Hands of Dominion' for 'Mutation Nation: Tales of Genetic Mishaps, Monsters, and Madness' (Rainstorm Press 2011) and 'Polyp' for 'The Mammoth Book of Body Horror' (Constable & Robinson 2012).

Barbie Wilde's first dark crime novel, 'The Venus Complex', was published by Comet Press on 1 November 2012. (The cover art for 'The Venus Complex' is by award-winning artist Daniele Serra.) Wilde has been called "...one of the finest purveyors of erotically charged horror fiction around" by Fangoria Magazine, Issue No. 320. And Gabino Iglesias of Horror Talk placed 'The Venus Complex' in his Top Books of 2012, saying: "A novel by a female Cenobite that gives the world a smart, artistic, cynical, cultured serial killer who could give Hannibal Lecter a run for his money. On top of that, this is a poignant, funny, sexually-charged, hardcore critique of popular culture and a deconstruction of relationships, academia, and art."

Sources
Interview with Barbie Wilde for 3:AM Magazine
Interview with Barbie Wilde for Horror News
Interview with Barbie Wilde for That Horror Thing
Interview with Barbie Wilde for Fatally Yours
Reviews for Sister Cilice in All Things Horror, Fatally Yours, Fangoria, SFX Magazine and Darkling Tales
Interview With The Ginger Nuts of Horror
Interview with The Death Rattle
Interview with Gabriel Ricard (Drunk Monkeys Website)
Interview with The Horror Society
Interview with Fangoria's Editor-in-Chief, Chris Alexander
Author's biog on the Comet Press website

External links

The Barbie Wilde Web Site

1960 births
21st-century British novelists
British women singers
British film actresses
British women short story writers
British television actresses
British women novelists
Living people
21st-century British women writers
21st-century British short story writers
Canadian emigrants to the United States